Sherani or Shirani is an entirely rural subdistrict in the Zhob division of the Balochistan province of Pakistan, with a population of 153,116 as of the 2017 census.  There are six villages of note: Ahmadi Dirga (Ahmedi Derga), Karama, Zarkai Landawar, Shinghar, Tsappar Kili, and Manikhawa (Mani Kwa). The subdistrict lies within the Sulaiman mountain range, and its highest point is Takht-e-Sulaiman.

Administrative history
Zhob is the parent district of Sherani District. Prior to 2006, Sherani was a subdivision (subdistrict) of Zhob. Sherani District was created on 3 January 2006, following the bifurcation of Zhob District.

History
The earlier history of the District is enshrouded in obscurity like that of the rest of Balochistan. At the beginning of the seventh century a Chinese pilgrim who visited India, Xuanzang, made the first mention of Zhob, describing it as the abode of Pashtuns. In 1398 Pir Muhammad bin Jahangir Mirza, grandson and appointed successor of Timurlane, led an expedition against the Pashtuns of the Suleiman Mountains. Both Nader Shah (reigned 1736–47) and Ahmed Shah Abdali (reigned 1747–73) extended their power through Balochistan and thence to Zhob and Sherani, so this area remained under the more or less nominal suzerainty of the Durranis and Barakzai.

Sherani was a quasi-independent and quite refractory tribe until brought under British control in the winter of 1890 following the Khiderzai expedition.

Traditional history of Bargha
The Bargha lands (highlands) were formerly held by the Hazaras, who deserted the country and migrated to Rozgan (Urazgan) in the north. The hypotheses based on traditional knowledge, substantiated by the Gazetteer, assert that around the 17th century the Bargha lands were left waste from fear of the Wazirs, and the Sheranis were engaged in constant and protracted wars with the Baitanis.

In those very early days the Bargha land had gained notoriety as a bandit-infested locality. Pillage and murder were endemic in the area. The leader of the Sheranis met a Syed boy of saintly countenance who had migrated from Pishin, and sought his supernatural help. With his miraculous help the Shiranis were victorious over the Baitanis. The leading men of the Shiranis sent a party of their tribe under his leadership and occupied the deserted lands of Bargha. This boy later married a Shirani woman and became "the nucleus and progenitor of the Harifal tribe."

Following his occupation of the Bargha land, the leading men of the Shirani besought him to run his horse from dawn to dusk, and the land his horse passed over would be his allocation of booty. He ran his horse, but the horse, being overstrained, fell down and died before dusk, while he was performing his Asr prayer (Arabic: صلاة العص). This land is now occupied by the Harifal tribe. Harif Nika's main attraction for the Sheranis was precisely the aura of mystical spirituality that built up around him.

All Shiranis, regardless of their location, out of courtesy call Harifals "Neeka", meaning grandpa, a status commanding more reverence even than that of father. When Mountstuart Elphinstone (1779–1859), a Scottish statesman and historian associated with the British government of India, visited this region in the early 19th century, he recorded that the Shiranis were led by a "Neeka" who was supported by an annual tax of one lamb and one calf on all those who raised those animals. Neeka served as a judge and a commander in-chief and had derived his authority from the belief that he is "Under the immediate guidance and protection of Providence."

Mountstuart Elphinstone, on page 382 of his book, An Account of the kingdom of Caubul and its dependencies in Persia, Tatary...., writes: "Neeka commands in their wars, and before any expedition, all the troops pass under his turban, which is stretched out for the purpose by the Neeka and a Moollah. This they think secures them from wounds and death; and they tell stories of persons who have lost their lives from neglecting or disdaining this ceremony".

Recognized as Khan of Largha and Bargha Shirani, Khan Mir Ajab Khan still lives in Largha. He and his family's leading members have made periodic visits to Harifal's country to pay homage and seek blessings.

According to the 1998 census, the recorded population of the district was 83,771, of which Harifal's population was 26,111 and Sherani's was 57,660. There are seven union councils: Kapip, Manikwa, Dhanasir, Mughalkot, Ahmedi Derga, Shinghar Harifal South, and Shinghar Harifal North.

The total number of voters in the district was 31,837, with 17,535 male voters and 14,302 female voters. Of these Harifal contained 8728, with 4797 male voters and 3931 female voters, while Sherani contained 23,109, with 12,738 male voters and 10,371 female voters.

British occupation
The Khiderzai Expedition gave full suzerainty over Sherani District to the British government. Natives remember the year 1890 as Da Gargorai Kal, the year of the uprising.

In 1889, the Viceroy of India, Lord Lansdowne, visited Dera Ismail Khan and realized the importance of occupying Zhob (Sherani included), and charged Robert Groves Sandeman with this important duty. The services of Mr. Bruce, then District Officer of DIK and political chargé of the Wazir and Sherani tribes, were placed at his disposal. On 19 December Sir Robert Sandeman started from Loralai. He was accompanied by a large party of Baloch and Brahui chiefs, including Nawab Shahbaz Khan Bugti (grandfather of Shaheed Nawab Akbar Khan Bugti and great-great-grandfather of the present Bugti chief), Nawab Mir Aali Bugti, and Brahamdagh Bugti.

On 27 December 1889, a grand darbar was held at Apozai, at which the assumption of the protectorate of the Zhob valley by the British Government was duly proclaimed. Captain MacIvor became the first Political Agent of the new Agency, which was made to comprise the Zhob, Bori and Barkhan valleys. Invitations were issued to the headmen of the Sherani, Harifal, Wazir, and other tribes interested to attend a friendly conference regarding the opening of the Gomel Pass. All attended except the Khiderzai, a section of the Sherani settled in Largha.

The chief complaint against the Khiderzai was their non-surrender of four refugees accused of murder and the refusal of Murtaza Khan to come in. The Khiddarzais were in conflict with both the Punjab and Balochistan. A deputation of the leading maliks of the tribe had waited upon the Deputy Commissioner of Dera Ismail Khan at Shekh Budin in June 1889, but had been dismissed because they could not guarantee the surrender of these criminals. A formal ultimatum was drawn up and dispatched to Murtaza Khan and the other Khiddarzai chiefs, calling upon them to surrender themselves without delay. They asked for a month to consider the matter.

Sir Robert Sandeman had convinced himself that Murtaza Khan had become a liability. He rejected negotiations in order to engage in military posturing, and ignored problems that strained their relations. Sandeman instructed General White that the only course left open now was to use force on these tribesmen. An immediate advance was accordingly resolved upon. For this expedition the Zhob Force was divided into two columns, one under Sir George White (1835–1912, later a British field marshal and recipient of the Victoria Cross) and the other under Colonel Nicolson, with a total of 1,651 men of all ranks.

The general plan was that the headquarters column should march by Wala, over the Muramuzh Range, to Namur Kalan, the headquarters of the Khiddarzais, and Nicolson's column by way of the Dhana to Mogul Kot, while at the same time Colonel Ross's force was to proceed to, and occupy, Drazand, the largest village of the Largha Sheranis.

The start from Apozai took place on 31 October. By 13 November all the principal points in Sherani were occupied. At Karama a grand inquest was held into the conduct of the tribe and fines imposed, and the proceedings were terminated by a darbar, at which the submission of the tribe was formally received and rewards conferred upon the deserving.

This is the British version of events, but those who resisted and earned a good name for it amongst the Sherani and Harifal tribes are also worth mentioning. Tribalism is a social feeling. It is a feeling of corporate sentiment, of oneness which makes those who are charged with it feel that they are kith and kin. Ancestor worship is therefore considered fully legitimate.

(1) Masho Khan Sherani. A legendary figure; himself a man of martial wisdom, he had harnessed the martial spirit of his tribe by forming a semi-military organization. He was a fighter of note and is said to have led an attack on British forces near Silyazai. His death made him a folk hero, still remembered in many Pashto ballads. He was from the Haizai sub-tribe of Sherani. He is survived by a renowned Kahol called Masho Kahool. They are conscious and proud of the gallant feats of their great grandfather.

(2) Murtaza Khan Sherani. He was the tribal chieftain of the Khiderzai sub-tribe when they resisted the British forces. His family is settled in Largha (lowland) of the Sherani country, now in the jurisdiction of Khyber Pukhtoonkhwah Province. After a gallant fight he was arrested and taken away in custody. Once taken away from his ancestral village, he never returned. He is survived by many grandsons. Prominent amongst them is Malik Aslam Khan and his son Asmat Khan Sherani settled in Dera Ismail Khan.

(3) Sindhai Sherani.  Another folk hero linked with Masho. He was Shamozai Hassankhail Sherani, and survived by a son, Malik Azeem Khan, who was later killed by his own nephews in an intra-family feud.

(4) Berkhurdar. He had a fort with corner towers on the west side of Spasta Valley and a village behind it. This was his stronghold, known as Birkhurdar's Fort. The place was feared, and the British called him "a famous old marauder". He is survived by a huge family known as Ashak Kahool, still living in the same place.

(5) Rani Gul, known for opening fire in January 1888 upon a reconnoitering party. He had a band of Khiderzai under him.

(6) Adam Khan Malezai Harifal, a close confidant of Masho Khan. Arrested after the death of Masho Khan, he languished in jail for quite a long time. He was the resident of Tarai. He is survived by a stammer grandson named Khanan in the village of Tarai. The Malezai among the Harifal are noted for their bravery and hospitality and are rightly proud of such ancestors as Adam Khan Malezai, who left a mark on the history of the tribe.

(7) Fazal Dirzai Harifal. He was a stout fighter and known for his spartan qualities. He was the resident of Pehlan village, situated at the foot of famous Shinghar. The British government had offered money for either his arrest or death. He was the toughest of all the tribe. The British failed to capture or kill him, and ultimately he migrated to Afghanistan.

(8) Bahar khan Sherani. Malik Bahar Khan was the tribal chieftain of the karmanzai sub-tribe of sherani. He fought against British occupation in silyazai in 1919 war in which his brother sathanadar karmanzai seriously injured. He was a confidant to Mashto khan. He is survived by a well known family called Attal kahool settled in karama Burgha sherani.

(9) Shikari Choharkhail, (10) Lundak Dirzai Sherani,(11) Shakoor karmanzai and (12) Alamgul Hassankhail were other Sheranis known for their resistance. Lundak was resident of Tarjana, later arrested and put behind the bar.

Modern history
On 3 July 2022, a bus traveling from Rawalpindi to Quetta carrying 33 people fell into a ravine, killing at least 20 people and injuring 11 others near Sherani District of Balochistan, Pakistan. It was the second major accident in a month. Earlier on 8 June a minivan crashed in Killa Saifullah District, killing 22 people. Rescue sources said that the bodies and injured were moved to Zhob and MughalKot.

Geography
The district is bounded by South Waziristan on the north, Dera Ismail Khan District (DIK) on the east, Musakhel District on the southeast, Zhob District on the south and west, and Paktika Province of Afghanistan on the northwest.  Dahna Pass links this district with DIK. The length of the gorge is 4 miles. Enclosing limestone cliffs rise perpendicularly some 15,000 feet. The gorge gradually narrows from 20 yards to a few feet.  The British made a road through the pass, thus connecting Zhob with Dera Ismail Khan. It took a decade, from 1895 to 1905, to complete the road. The area of the district is 2800 km2.

In the north-east of the Balochistan plateau, Zhob and Sherani Basin forms an oval surrounded on all sides by mountains. Qais Abdul Rashid (575-661 A.D.), who is believed to be one of the progenitors of the Pushtoons, lived in the Suleiman Mountains. Natives call the place where he is buried "Da Kase Ghar" (the mountain of Qais). In Pushto "K" is used for "Q".

In 1883, with the consent of the chiefs of the Sherani tribe (the inhabitants of the range), a survey party under Major Holdich, R.E., ascended the mountain, accompanied by a military escort. They found the summit of the ridge to consist of a long valley between two high rims, covered with the chilgoza or edible pine (Pinus gerardiana). At the north end of the western rim is the highest peak, known as Kaisa Ghar, 11,300 feet above sea level; at the south end of the eastern rim is the Takht, properly so called, 3441 meters (11,060 feet) above sea level.

The general elevation of the district is about 1500 to 3000 meters. Shinghar is 9273 feet high. Torghar is the continuation of the southern hills of the Suleiman range; its highest peak is Charkundai (7517 feet above sea level). Dhana Sir, the head of Dhana (elevation 3900 feet), is on a rough stony plateau, along with the bed of the Chuhar Khel Dhana. Between the Chuhar Khel and Khiddarzai Dhanas is a very narrow and steep pass called Khaoaranai Narai. The Hatsu Bund (elevation 5750 feet) divides the Urja-sara plain from the Spasta plain. 
 
In June 1891, the first Political Agent in Zhob, Captain I. MacIver (22 January 1890 to 14 March 1898), and Sir Henry visited the area of Takht-e-Sulaiman and recorded their account, dated 8 August 1894 and published in the Geographical Journal for that year. The Takht-e-Sulaiman shrine is situated on a ledge below the crest of the southernmost bluff of Kaisa-ghar Mountain. The two sister peaks (Shinghar and Kiasaghar) form the highest part of the Suleiman range.

Many legends attach to this place; one legend says Noah's Ark alighted here after the Deluge, while others connect it with King Solomon, whose throne alighted on this peak, which has ever since borne the name of Takht-i-Suleiman. Lofty ranges west of the Takht-i-Suleiman contain strata of the liassic (lower Jurassic) and middle Jurassic (about 208 to 146 million years ago).

The district's rainfall is about 10 inches. Clouds causing rain in the district come from the Bay of Bengal, the largest bay in the world. The climate is hot and dry in summer. January is the coldest month, with a mean maximum and minimum temperature of about 11.5 and 1.9 °C respectively. July is the hottest month, with a mean maximum and minimum temperature of about 36.7 and 21.8 °C respectively. Being within the monsoon zone, the district receives heavy rainfall in summer from July to September. The District Headquarters is under construction at Stano Raaghah.

Sheen Ghar
Shin Ghar is a subsidiary of the main Suleiman range and separated from it by the Lahar Valley. It extends from Kurchpina on the north and the Sulyazai valley on the south. The height of the main peak is 9273 feet. It is about 50 km from Zhob City and almost due west of the Takht-i-Sulaiman. The top is fairly level and affords a pleasant site which was used as a sanatorium during summer months in the British era, and has been taken over by FC.

The hill is well wooded with edible pine. The wood of edible pine trees being very easily inflammable, they catch fire due to the friction of flint stone and are burnt down.

Adjoining the mountain's top is the shrine of a famous Sufi saint, Babakr Nika Harifal. Devotees visit the shrine regularly for answers to their prayers. The saint was prone to religious ecstasy and mystical trances. He was a man of miracles; it is believed that many trees followed him when he migrated from his native place. PMDC have reported many coal deposits in Shinghar; prospects are high if they are mined. The western slopes of the range drain into the Zhob river, and the eastern into the Khaisara stream. This watershed demarcates the boundary line between the Harifal and Sherani tribes.

The main nullah in the Lahar valley is Chachobi nullah, traversing the Kwarea wasta. Lahar Stream takes its source near Hatsu watershed and carries the drainage of the southernmost hills of the Kaisa Ghar and Shinghar, then runs northwards between those ranges, its permanent flow beginning at Karghali. After irrigating lands in the Kurai Wasta, Ahmedi Darga, Niazi Kot and Kachhi, it continues its course to the north, and taking a sharp turn to the east through lgad Pass in the Suleiman range, drains into the Gomel River near DIK in KPK.

In autumn 1897 a slight shock of earthquake was felt in Sherani District in which several houses in Ghurlama, Kacchi, Burkhurdar and Pasta fell down. No human or livestock loss is on record.

Demographics

At the time of the 2017 census the district had a population of 152,952, all of which was rural. Sherani had a sex ratio of 812 females per 1000 males and a literacy rate of 28.00% - 39.25% for males and 15.39% for females. 68,410 (44.73%) were under 10 years. of age. Pashto was the predominant language, spoken by 99.17% of the population.

The inhabitants of the district generally live in stone built houses with flat mud roofs, while nomads live in improvised tenements. The infant mortality rate is 73 infants/1000 live births. Geographically the Shiranis are divided into two groups, those residing to the east of the Suleiman range being known as the Largha Shiranis, falling under the administrative control of Dera Ismail Khan, while those residing to the west of that range are called the Bargha Shiranis and come under the jurisdiction of Sherani District. This division was effected by the British Raj following the Khiderzai Expedition in 1890. The physical configuration of the country makes the separation so complete that the two tribal divisions act independently of each other.

Composition and infrastructure
A typical tribal society prevails in the district, with its own demographic dynamics. As elsewhere in Pashtun society, customs are strictly observed according to the tribal code of honor; as J.P. Ferrier puts it, the lex talionis is rigorously observed amongst the Pashtuns, and the murderer is put to death by the nearest relative of his victim. It sometimes happens that the person on whom this duty devolves is a child, when the punishment remains in abeyance until he is strong enough to hold the dagger placed in his hands with which he performs the office of executioner. He possesses the right to grant the murderer his life, but there is no instance of this right ever having been exercised except for a compensation, which the criminal is obliged to make in money or in land; sometimes he gives one of his daughters in marriage to the son or the brother of the murdered man, without the father being obliged to give her any dowry.

The level of development can be well imagined from the fact that there is not a single inch of metalled road in the entire Harifal area. Sherani District is entirely rural. The whole district is a "B" area except Manikhwah, and so is controlled by a Deputy Commissioner through Levies force. Only one police station exists in Manikhwa, having jurisdiction over a 5 km. radius. Sherani District holds a unique place in terms of missed opportunities, infrastructure and roads not taken. There is not a single township (or for that matter a bazaar) or a single Jumu'ah mosque for jummah prayer, so no jummah prayer is offered anywhere in the district. The whole district is economically oriented to Zhob city, but it contains not a single branch of any bank.

No district hospital exists in the whole district. There are three regional health clinics, one each at Manikhwa and Mir Ali Khail, while a third is under construction at Killi Ibrahimkhail Harifal. Similarly there are five BHUs, located in Kapip, Killi Gul Muhammad, Kuraiwasta, Karamma and Surlakai. All five BHUs are in the Sherani area, none in Harifal country. Sherani, like Awaran, Kalat and Turbat, has a growth rate of less than 1 percent, which is unusual for Pakistan. The district is saturated with malaria and infested with [scorpions] and snakes. In 2009, 132 cases of tuberculosis were detected in the district, and in 2008, 75 cases of tuberculosis were treated though TODS therapy. The rate of contraception in the district is: by any modern method, 4.7%, by traditional method, 1%, for a total of 5.7% by any method.

There are eight civil dispensaries, one in the Harifal area and seven in the Sherani area. Three are run by PPHI located in Ibrahinkhail Harifal, Dag-Lawara and Asthshai, while five are still being operated by D.H.O., located in Mir Ali Khail, Adil Abad, Nor Warsak, Skharyae Kazha and Surlakai. Only four doctors, four pharmacists, and two L.H.V. form the total health staff for the entire district. There is no female doctor, no dentist, no nurse, and no midwife in the whole of the district. There are 9,210 electricity connections in the district. The total length of its roads is 205 km, of which 85 km is NHA and 120 km is farm to market roads. The road density in Balochistan is 0.15 km per square kilometer, which is less than half the national average and the lowest among Pakistan's four provinces, partly reflecting the sparse population located in a few areas. There is no public toilet, no park and no playground.

Sherani District is the home of two indigenous tribes, the Sherani and the Harifal. This district is credited as the cradle of the Pashtun race. The people are strongly religiously inclined, so the Mullah is a potent political force and the epitome of authority, notwithstanding its intrinsic political crevices. Life is still regulated from the Mosque. Out of seventy-two squabbling sects, the Deobandi Sunni Sect (orthodox Hanafi school of Islamic Jurisprudence) is predominant on the whole, with Tablighi Jamaat as their preacher. This religious organization is of inert conviction, a non-political wing of the Deobandi school of thought, and a counterweight to the ulema. Hardly a household has missed consuming some amount of time with this Jamat. They stress the value of rituals and outward imitation of the prophet. Most are not literate enough to sift Arab culture from the true essence of the message of the Prophet.

Here religion is not seen as an impersonal system of belief and practices, but rather as a matter of personal faith. Religious exploitation is organically linked with the people and land. Religion is considered as a self-correcting principle preventing dispersion, and the cornerstone of socio-political equilibrium.

Notwithstanding feuds being endemic in Shirani, even in the past murder for mere lust of blood was very rare. The crime rate in the Harifal tribe is extremely low.

Tribes and their habitats
Tribes have largely been configured around ethnicity and geography. In tribal society clan loyalty matters more than anything else. Here blood speaks its own language. Local clan solidarity has always exercised a decisive influence on the electoral process. The Pushtoon tribal system with its egalitarian ethos allows more scope for individual enterprise than the hierarchical Baloch tribal system.

The Baloch and Brahui tribes are organized on an oligarchic basis, with a great respect for their chiefs. The political organization of both the Pathan and Baloch is tribal, but the Pathan are essentially radical and obey no one but the Jirga or democratic council, while the Baloch remain loyal to their Chief. In Balochistan the people live under a feudal system. It is the foundation and basis of the polity and the system on which the administration itself is based. The Jirga affords the machinery by which the people's own system is used in the administration. Tribal codes lay down certain rules. Tribesmen are lawless and rough people and do not understand technicalities and formalities, but value the substance of justice more than its form.

Tribesmen try to conserve what they have inherited and show aversion to change in the older order of things. They are very possessive, and have a fierce attachment to their particularistic traditions. For instance, they still use outdated utensils, like the "gudva", which is a copper can with a spout, and the "badnae" (lota) for potable water. So far the jug and glass have not replaced these. Similarly with dress; women still wear gaiters (paichy), white for unmarried girls and red or green for married woman. Similarly, the kholay (cuff), grayvan (chest crochet) and trata (belt crochet) are part and parcel of the Pushtani frock. The Pushtu cultural system of codified rules for behaviour gives women no way to determine their own honour except through modesty and service to a patron.

Overseas employment has improved the standard of living without prejudice to the inbred unwritten tribal code and tenacious adherence to it.  Development for them does not mean a wholesale rejection of traditions. Wholesale transplanting of innovations into a tribal society could not overcome the ferocious power of tradition; it is essential to graft these innovations only after first making the environment congenial and receptive.

The district has only two tribes, the Shirani and the Harifal, a coalescence of two diverse ethnic elements. The Sherani tribe has three main branches, Hasan Khel, Oba Khel, and Choharkhail. Hasan Khel is further divided into Kapip, Karmanzai, Muhammad Zai, Haizai, Ranaizai, etc. Muhammad Zai is the biggest clan. Certain stereotypical ideas of inbred tribal traits of some sub-tribes or even main tribes have gained currency, e.g., "A Sherani's word can generally be relied upon". The Haizai are considered the brains of the Sherani; all outstanding personalities come from this clan. For instance, Senator Maulana Muhammad Khan Sherani, a renowned intellectual, ex-MNA, and Chairman of the Islamic Ideological Council, and Sain Kamal Khan Sherani, Lal Gul Sherani, Dr Fazal-ud-din, DHO. Sherani, Professor Ameer Muhammad, and Haji Hassan, ex-District Nazim, are all Haizai.

Certain families, called blacksmiths and weavers (working tapestry job), in both Harifal and Sherani do exist, who are treated neither better nor worse than any poor relation.

A proverb about Harifal says, "It is like cooked meat which gets cool but never gets raw." The peoples of Sherani District have a long historical background. They put up resistance to the British occupation. Masho Khan Sherani, a folk hero, was the leader of these Sherani warriors. The British forces attempted to have him arrested but failed. He was killed during fighting against the British army in the famous area of Zhob District called Silyazi. After the murder of Masho Khan his many companions were arrested, including his confidant Adam Khan Harifal.

During the era of Amir Amanullah Khan many Harifal families migrated to Afghanistan to escape the British Raj and are still settled there in Loghar, Makwar, and Kabul. Prominent amongst them were Nazak Harifal, Abdulraheem Harifal, Gooloon Harifal and Majeed Harifal. Sheranis were notoriously irrepressible.

A gang of Sheranis, along with some Wazirs, killed one British political agent freshly posted at Fort Sandeman (Zhob), Mr. Herbert Gob Finis Ob, near Hasu-Band (watershed) on 30 November 1923. The agent had assumed charge i.e., on 1 November 1923. He was buried in Zhob. His grave is near Zhob Aerodrome. His grave had an inscribed marble slab.

Harifal chapter
The Harifal tribe is the second largest indigenous tribe in the district and is divided into three main branches, Hassan Khail, Naqeeb Khail and Ibrahim Khail. Ibrahim Khail has no further offshoots, while Hassan Khail is the largest clan, comprising Mallizai, Dirzai, Habibzai, Landawar, Umerzai, Nakunderzai, Babakarzai, etc. Naqeeb Khail is further subdivided into Draykhanzai, Nikan, Watozai, Bababtaizai, Lalakzai, Khiderzai, etc.  Their progenitor, Arif (Harif) Neeka, from whom the eponym Harifal is derived, was a man with supernatural powers, able to work miracles. He was credited with the power to render an enemy's bullet harmless.

The word Harifal is a word etymologically corrupted by the particular Pushto accent, sharply contrasted with Arabic. Pushto is not a kindred language to Arabic and has no equivalent of the Arabic character ain (ع) to be exactly articulated, just as English has no equivalent for this Arabic character, so Pashto speakers always convert the Arabic glottal ain (ع) into a palatal fricative hay {soft hay}. The phonemes /q/, /f/ tend to be replaced by [k] and {P}, so that Arif is invariably pronounced as Harif or Harip. Thus Arif-Aal, Haripal, Hurreepaul and Harifal are all homophones but also heterographs; the last is most correct and most commonly used in Urdu script.
 
The Harifal genealogically are of Syed descent, but over a period of time, through social assimilation, have been so much subsumed in Sherani that they are indistinguishable from them to an outsider and are presumed to be collaterals of Sherani. The tribe as a whole is held in high esteem by all Sheranis for their high descent. Tribal norms bound them in a pledge of reciprocal assistance and to common participation of weal and woe. This gave birth to a homogeneous tribal set-up. This homogeneity accelerated the process of assimilation to the extent that Sherani (not Marani) has almost become a common denominator in terms of geographical nomenclature. If either tribe were attacked by a third they both would stand together. On the social side they are organically linked in a curious love and hate relationship.

The Harifal, like other minor Syed tribes, e.g., Khosti,  Taran, Garshin, Lodhin, Mishwani, Ustrani, Peechi, Shadezai, Huramzai, Gangalzai, are direct descendants from the line of the prophet, but bear a distinct tribal name rather to be recognized by a generic name "Syed." Thus generic name was replaced by surname. The generic name is mostly assumed by microscopic Syed communities in tribal set up not by those having distinct population. Being Syed, the Harifal are conscious of their noble birth. They were exempted from taxes during the British era.

Fanaticism cannot be assigned to them as a fault, as their religious obligations are perfunctory. They make the five times prayer every day, observe the fast of Ramazan, and maintain the most rigorous observance of external forms. They are religious more from habit than conviction. Their major preoccupation is with external conformity to Islam. They do not adhere to the militant brand of Islam.

Religion, like any other human activity, is often abused, but at its best it helps human beings to cultivate a sense of the sacred inviolability of each individual and thus to mitigate the murderous violence to which our species is tragically prone.

Starting from its nucleus, Arif, the tribe grew gradually. The overgrown bulk of the tribe has been divided into clans, the clans into sections and the sections into subsections, the vernacular equivalent of which is kahool. The Harifal country has served strategically as a buffer zone between warring Sherani and border tribes like Suliemankhail, Wazir and Dottani.

Villages
According to the 1998 census, there were 186 rural villages in Sherani district, though 16 of these were unpopulated.

A substantial population of the Sherani tribe lives in the neighbouring district of Zhob, but its major settlement is still in Sherani District. The Harifal tribe mostly live on the western slopes of Shinghar, although a considerable number live in Harifalabad, Islamyar and Ganj Mohalla in Zhob District and also a scattered population in Duki Tehsil of Loralai District, Sanjavi Tehsil of Ziarat District, Zarkanai Draban of DIK district, and Quetta. In Quetta the famous Imdad Hospital (formerly Imdad Cinema) and New Grand Hotel are owned by a Harifal family. Haji Niaz Muhammad alias Niazo (Nano), an outstanding member of the Chamber of Commerce and Industry Balochistan, settled in Kasi Killa Quetta, belongs to the Harifal tribe.

Two union councils, Shinghar Harifal South, with 23 villages (13,883 souls), and Shinghar Harifal North, with 31 villages (12,228 souls), are completely occupied by the Harifal tribe, in addition to other scattered populations. The major villages in Shinghar Harifal North are Brahimkhail, Pasta, Kahza, Zawar-kar, Beezai and Dawalgadh; those in S.H. South are Draykhanzai, Shacha, Samazai, Khaderzai, Manda-Harifal, Raghasir-Nikaan and Howdakai.

Mir Ali Khel. Located eight kilometers west of the capital of Stano Raaghah. Residents of the village belong to the Muhammad Zai sub-caste and Hazai sub-caste of Sherani. It is situated on the bank of the Zhob River. About 5 km to the south of Mir Ali Khail, the Zhob River is joined by the SriToi River from the west. Passing to the north of Mughal Kot Fort (about 14 miles from Mir Ali Khail), the Zhob River finally falls into the Gomel near Kajuri Kach, where it ends. The Zhob River, a sluggish turbid river, makes a journey of 240 miles from Kan Mehtherzai to Kajori Kach. The Gomal River is the boundary between Baluchistan and Waziristan from Kundar Domandi to Kajuri-Kach.

Mir Ali Khel is the birthplace (1938) of Senator Maulana Muhammad Khan Sherani, also Chairman of the Islamic Ideological Council. He was previously elected as an MNA in 1988–1990, 1990–1993 and 1997–1999. He was also elected as a member of the National Assembly in 2002 from NA-264, Zhob-cum-Killa-Saifullah.

Mani Khwah. Manikhwa is the Tehsil headquarters and most relatively developed area in the district. It is situated approximately 25 kilometers from the Zhob district, along Zhob D.I. Khan road. Mani Khwah (elevation 5600 feet) is at the head of the Spasta Valley, almost covered by wild olive trees which fringe upon the valley and cover the hillsides. The Takht-i-Suleiman can be seen to the northeast, as well as the Kaiser Ghar.  Both make an impressive picture with their grim and grey precipices rising high above the plantations of "chilghoza" on their sides below. Shin Ghar and the Spasta plain can also be seen. There is one police station, a high school, RHC, FC post, veterinary hospital, college, and the only telephone exchange in the district.

Kapip. To the west of Mani-khwa is Kapip village, elevation 5140 ft. It is about 15 km from Zhob, and located on the left bank of the Siliaza Nullah. On the hillsides a good number of wild olive trees are to be seen. The residents of Manikhwa and Kapip are Choharkhail and Kapip respectively. Sardar Ayub Choharkhail and Mir Adam Kapip belong to this area.

Lahar Kali.  This area belongs to the Karmanzai sub-caste of Sherani. It is situated 35 km from Zhob district. Many residents of the village work in the United Arab Emirates, and some people of the village drive mini coaches on the Zhob-D.I. Khan route. There are a few other villages of the Karmanzai subcaste of Sherani, including Purai Kali, Khankai, Ghurlama, and Pasta. The late Haji Zarif Khan Aseebzai was the most prominent personality from Khankai.

Khankai Haji Zarif Khan is the village almost 36 km from zhob District. The late Haji Zarif Khan Aseebzai was the most prominent personality. now Malik Moula Dad Khan sherani is the Head, Ex-chairman of Zhob city Muhammad Ibrahim sherani, known as Gul Lala, DSP Balochistan Police Rahim Dad Khan Sherani, journalist Karim Dad sherani belong to Khankai Haji Zarif Khan. GBH School, GGM school and District sherani Post office are there at Khankai Zarif Khan.this village is famous due to greenery and trees around it.

Kazha Malizai is the village having the highest literacy rate in the entire Harifal country. It is one of the biggest villages in Harifal country, having a population of 1371 souls. It has one primary school for girls and one for boys. Their summer dwellings are in Psha, a good site for a future sanitarium (health resort).
This area has provided several executive officers to the government of Balochistan.  Prominent amongst them are Dr. Muhammad Akbar Harifal BCS, Provincial Secretary to the Government of Balochistan, Dr. Muhammad Anwar Harifal, Muhammad Asghar Harifal, BCS Provincial Secretary to the Government of Balochistan, Taj Muhammad Harifal, BCS Deputy Commissioner, Shah Muhammad, Provincial Bureau Chief APP, Muhammad Akram Tehsildar, Yasir Ahmed, M&EO in PMU Labour and Man Power Department, Quetta, Balochistan, and Baaj Gul Harifal, an educationist. They belong to a town-bred class with aboriginal links to Kazha Malezai. Dr. Muhammad Akbar (T.st) was awarded the Tamgha Shujat by President Rafiq Tarar on 23 March 1999 in recognition of his meritorious and dedicated services with selfless devotion in recovering an abducted child, Shaji-ul-Haq, son of Dr. Mobin-ul-Haq, in Naurak Sulaiman Khail Gulistan Killa Abdullah District in 1996. During this operation, which he led in his capacity of SDM Gulistan on 22 October 1996, he sustained a bullet in his thigh, resulting in a compound fracture of his right femur, for which he underwent four major surgical operations with bone grafting at Jokhio Hospital, Karachi. He was also awarded a Gold Medal as best administrator in 1997, in recognition of his exemplary courage and devotion beyond the call of duty, by the then Provincial Minister S&GAD, Mr. Bismillah Khan Kakar. Mr. Shahbaz Khan Mandokhail, then Commissioner Quetta Division, also awarded him a T.T. Pistol for the same actions. Dr. Muhammad Akbar Harifal held various key positions in the Government of Balochistan, including Assistant Commissioner, SDM, Deputy Commissioner, Commissioner, District Coordination Officer, District Administrative Officer, Joint Chief Economist, and Provincial Secretary for Home and Tribal Affairs, Livestock and Dairy Development and Law and Parliamentary Affairs. Muhammad Asghar Harifal BCS also held various key positions in the Government of Balochistan: Assistant Commissioner, SDM, District Coordination Officer, Zhob, D.C.O. Musakhail, D.A.O. & D.C.O. Kohlu Deputy Commissioner, Punjgoor,Deputy Commissioner Killa Abdulla, Additional Secretary,Secretary Social Welfare,Secretary Food and is Secretary Culture, Tourism and Archives.
Kazha is situated in the east of Ibrahimkhail Harifal. Malizai is the biggest sub-tribe in Hassan Khail Harifal. Besides Kazha, their two other villages are Tarai and Qumai (1219 souls). Malik Muhammad Umer is the Malik of Kazha Malizai. Amongst other notables was the late Haji Naseeb Khan, who died on 16 March 2011. Haji Naseeb Khan was the father of the well known social figure Juma Muhammad Harifal and of Raza Muhammad Harifal, a civil servant in the judiciary.

Ibrahim Khail Harifal. Ibrahimkhail is the most famous and well populated village in the entire Harifal country, having more than 200 households, and is the capital of the Harifal country. There is a perennial spring called Cheena which irrigates the land nearby Lalak wam. The present Sardar Qasam Khan Harifal belongs to this village. The members of Ibrahimkhail Harifal are credited with powers to cast out devils, and their charms are much sought after.

Maulana Shams-ud-din Harifal Shaheed, who happened to be the first Deputy Speaker of the Balochistan Assembly during the era of Z.A. Bhutto, was also from this village. He was elected from PB10 Zhob in 1972, and assassinated on 14 March 1974. Molvi Ahmed Shah Harifal, Paish imam military mosque Zhob, also belongs to this village. 
Almost all documentation for declaring Harifal an independent Tehsil is completed, with Ibrahimkhail as its Tehsil headquarters. In the vicinity of Ibrahimkhail are various villages, including Pahlan, Dwalgad, Kaza Landawar, Killi Malik Arsala Harifal, and Killi Malik Balak, which are nothing more than irregular collections of stone houses, such as are seen elsewhere in Balochistan. Killi Zawar Kar, Sacha, Samazai, Manda Harifal, and Howdaki are some other major villages of the Harifal tribe. Molvi Jamal ud Din, Dabzai Harifal, was a prominent political figure of JUI who was murdered in the prime of his youth. Molvi Naik Muhammad and Jalil Harifal are two other notables, from Dwalgud and Landawar respectively.

KIlli Baizhaie Harifal. Situated on the edge of Harifal country, it is populated by Habibzai Harifal. Habibzai is a sub-branch of Ahmand. Ahmand is the second largest branch of Hassankhail Harifal, numerically inferior only to Malezai. Ahmand includes Bakarzai, Habibzai, Mangalzai-Landai, and Dwalgad. Haji Abdul Hakim Harifal is the most prominent personality of this village, and has been settled in Islamabad. He is a well known contractor of CDA Islamabad and a staunch nationalist political worker, initially affiliated with PKMAP, but afterwards giving up active politics.

Killi Draykhanzai. This is the fatherland of Saleem Khan Kahool, the most popular and powerful Kahool in the entire tribe. The late Shahbaz Khan alias Shabai, a legendarily rich and generous man, was from this village. Mr. Amanullah Khan Harifal alias Lallo is a notable and prominent political figure, affiliated with ANP, a leader in the making. He also contested the election in 2008 for Provincial Assembly from PB18 on the ticket of the ANP and won 1175 votes.

Ragha Sir Nikan. This village is inhabited by the Nikan clan, a branch of the Naqeebkhail Harifal. Mr. Zahir Shah Harifal, ex-chairman of Zakat District Zhob (including Sherani), comes from this village. Zahir Shah Harifal is a prominent political figure affiliated with JUI, and a member of its central general council, a man of imperturbable disposition being groomed in company of Maulana Sherani for future responsibilities. Suleman Shah Harifal, serving as Reporting Officer in the Provincial Assembly of Balochistan, is another prominent personality among the inhabitants of this village. The late Fazal Harifal was a leading tribal man in Naqeebkhail Harifal.

Stano Raaghah is the district headquarters. This area belongs to the Muhammad Zai sub-caste of the Sherani tribe. It is near the Zhob River. Construction of district complexes is in progress. Unfortunately none of the planned development elsewhere has ever gone beyond blue prints. The development-starved district needs crash programs in every sector.

Spusta is a wavy plain covered with wild olives. It is high, cold, and barren, and is inhabited in summer by the Murhails, a pastoral tribe, who move in winter into Damaun. They live entirely in tents, and have the manners of the other shepherd tribes.

Chachobi  is one of the biggest villages of the district. It is approximately 10 kilometers (6.2 miles) away from the capital of the district, Stano Raghah. Residents of the village belong to the Aseebzai, Zareenkhel, Bari Khai Muhammad Zai sub-castes of Sherani. The village is fortunate to have a middle school.

Tarkhabayan is an important village of the district inhabited only by the Aseebzai Tribe. The village population is approximately 25 thousand and strength of village is 28 miles.
 
Shna Ponga. Residents of this village belong to the Hazai clan. A large number of the people of the village migrated to Zhob district due to an internecine tribal feud. The legacy of this internecine feud could not be expunged from their tribal history. There is one primary school in the village. Sain Kamal Khan Sherani, a renowned intellectual, was from this village, but had long since moved to Silyazi.

Ahmadi Darga and Karama are two other villages of the Oba Khel sub-caste of the Sherani tribe. Karama is the place where after the Khiderzai expedition the British held a grand inquest into the conduct of the tribe, imposing suitable fines and terminating the proceeding by a darbar, at which the submission of the tribe was formally received and rewards were conferred upon the deserving. Malik Din Muhammad s/o Momin was an outstanding personality of the Obakhail clan. Shuja Muhammad Sherani (Rtd SSP), a renowned and Advocate Imran Shah Sherani works as an advocate in the high court and Federal shriat court Islamabad. In the last election, in 2008, he stood for Provincial Seat PB 18 Zhob cum Sherani, affiliated with JUI. He comes from the Obakhail sub-tribe. senior police officer, is another prominent man born in Obakhail.

A well known and famous personality of Oba khel tribe, Malak Noor Muhammad Khan Sherani son of Malak Jalal khan is Head tribesmen of Oba khel tribe and Malak of All-Thal khan tribe (sub tribe in Obakhel ) is from Ahmadi Dargah. Malak Noor Muhammad is known for his tribesmen council decisions, political movement and educational awareness for his people. He and his allies are chief supporters of Moulana Muhammad Khan sherani. His cousin Muhammad Saleem Sherani is the first and so far the last person in District Sherani who earned a PhD in the United States of America in range management, now a retired Forest Secretary of the government of Balochistan. He also comes from the Obakhail sub-tribe.

Lawara is a small village of Oba Khel sub-caste. It is situated eight kilometers east of Mani Khwa, along the Zhob D.I. Khan road. Muhammad Abbas Khan Shaheed was from this village. He was the first student of International Islamic University Islamabad from Balochistan. He died in a road accident.

Mraghbal (also known as Mehrapi) is the village of the Manakzai clan. The residents of the village are mostly businessmen. There are no schools, but one religious seminary (madrsa). Five kilometres to the south of Mraghbal is Tor-Ragha, having one primary school and populated by Bari Khail.

Mughal Kot is situated two kilometres from the capital of the district. It is located at the border of Sherani District and adjoining FATA [south Waziristan] FC post, which has stood there since the British era. This area has assumed a geostrategic importance in the "war on terror".

Education
A disproportionate attendance of religious seminaries is quite conspicuous in Sherani District. 
Female education is a sort of social enigma.

Balochistan has an educational system, coupled with a traditional approach to the role of women. Like all other institutions, educational institutions here are ailing institutions. The faculty at these institutions are disillusioned, professionally inactive, and with a rural orientation, though now not poorly paid, as they were once. Teachers are unqualified as well as untrained, with a rural outlook; corporal punishment is central to teaching from elementary to secondary level, under an unwritten common law doctrine of in loco parentis, whereby a school has the same rights over a minor as its parent. The contents of the syllabus are mainly peripheral subjects, which are a rigid rehash of the state's official views with stereotypes of the rest of the world thrown in. Students in these schools still use wooden slates (takhti) which they plaster with yellow chalk and write on with reed pens.

Although no society is immune from religious exploitation, the abysmally low literacy rate exposes their raw minds to religious purveyors who play upon their ignorance. Balochistan is the least literate province of Pakistan, with a literacy rate of 37% (20% for women), compared to 54% nationally. The lack of secular education is more noticeable in Balochistan than in any other province, with 50% of children compelled to attend the religious schools. This is not surprising, given that the national budget for the MRA (Ministry of Religious Affairs) is around 1.2 billion rupees, whilst the secular education ministry is allocated 200 million. These factors encourage seminaries, and thus religion invariably lay its heavy hand on the social life of the district. Extremism incubates in these religious seminaries, and cleaning Pakistan of this malaise is no mean enterprise.

There is only one intermediate college in the entire district, with 19 teachers and 70 students, and four high schools with 67 teachers, insufficient for the thousands of boys aspiring to admission. All four high schools and the college are located in the sherani area, none in Harifal. Similarly, only eight middle-standard boys' schools with 263 enrolled students and 102 teachers exist in the whole district.  
There are Boys' Middle Schools in the following villages: Chachobi, Karhama, Killi Alam Khan, Kori Wasta, Madrisa Khuk Kai, K Shaman Zai and Sore Lakai. The district is without even a single girls' Middle or High School. In the entire district there are 15 Primary girls' schools.  Of these 15 schools, two are located in the Harifal area, Ibrahimkhail and Kazha Malizai.

There are girls' primary schools in the following villages: Aghburgai, Ahmedi Dargha, Hassu Band, Ibrahim Khail, Istashi, Kazha Abdul Manan, Khanki Zarif (Middle School), Kapeep, Killi Hayat Khan, K. Hakim Khan Shirani, Sangar, Lowarah, Sharan Sarmaki, Spin Shah and Zandi Malozai.

The total number of boys' primary schools is 131, of which 23 fall to the share of Harifal and 108 are located in the Sherani area. Their locations are as follows: Punkai, Pir Muhammad Kapeep, Qilla Saad Ullah, Qilla Din Muhammad, Raagha Mina Dadak, Ragha Sar, Sakhar Sar, Sar Naraie,  Sarah Arbooz, Killi Shacha,  Agheeahz,  Shaheen Panakai, Shairaw, Shankai Kona, Shin Lundai,  Shina Kazha, Shina Poonga, Killi Shina Siaza,  Sipna Shah, Spara Aghbargai, Spin Wawarhh, Spina Landai, Sur Lundi, Sari Toie, Tabelo Harifal, Tabila Warha, Taria Noor Khan, Tarjana Khano, Tore Ghundi, Tore Bundmungalzai, Tour Ragha Sar, Tala Kurham Ramzan, Tungi Kona, Upper Chachobi, Upper Mandah, Killi Firoz, Zalar Khan, Zarha Qilla, Zarina Chuhai, Zarkai Landawar, Zeendi Waam, Zhara Aghbargai, Zore Karh.

There are twelve Mosque Schools, located in the following villages: Arth Amir Khan, Baizhaie, Hoodkai Raghsar, Killi Naik Muhammad Kuraam, Looie Ragha Julander, Lowra Khidar Zai, Munda Harifal Malik Qalandar, Sakh Rai Kazha, Shin Ore Muzh, Shur Ghali, Abdullah Khan, Msq Silyaz, Tarai, Tore Ghundi and Zar Bana.

Though no authentic figures of female literacy rate are available, even rudimentary guesses make the female literacy rate not more than 3%, while the male rate as reported by the NCHD is about 18%. 76 schools are working with one teacher and one room without any shelter. There are five registered Seminaries and five private Schools.  The NCHD is running five feeder Schools. Teachers in these private schools work in a quack fashion and use very crude methods of teaching, including bastinado-type caning on the hands. 83% of schools are without electricity, 45% are without a boundary wall, 50% are without a toilet, and 35% are without drinking water.

Income resources
The bulk of the youth of the Harifal tribe, like those of Sherani (mainly unskilled labor), travel across the Arabian sea to seek at least a menial job in the oil-rich United Arab Emirates or Saudi Arabia. This Diaspora is attributed wholly to the economic impoverishment of the Harifal land and to the presence of employment and better living conditions due to the oil boom in these states. Overseas remittances are the main economic artery, which has much improved the local standard of life. Livestock and tilling some fertile land are the second source of income. The economy is sustained by agriculture and pasturage, but the scarcity of water restricts wide scale farming, while the low literacy rate prevents entrance into government service. All these factors cumulatively keep the local people in a vicious cycle of poverty. The majority of the population belong to lower socio-economic strata.

In the British era the majority of Harifal and Bargha Sherani used to go to Siahband, Herat and Maimana in Afghanistan to collect asafetida . Asafoetida is a plant of the parsley family; a fetid resinous gum is obtained from its roots, used in herbal medicine and Indian cooking, and also as a bactericide in preparing "landi". Many Harifal and Sherani families are still settled in Loghar, Makwar, Ghazni and Kabul in Afghanistan. They used to travel there from April to October, the journey occupying two months. They used to sell the asafoetida in Dera Ismail Khan, and go as far as Bombay in the south and Kanpur in the north of India. Shahbaz Khan Harifal alias Shabai, son of Saleem Khan Harifal, was the richest trader in those early days in this business.

Flora and fauna

Among the flora of Sherani one may find hundreds of species of some pretty exotic plants. The principal trees are tamarisk (ghaz in Pashto, gazg in Balochi), also called salt cedar, pistachios, juniper (obashta in Pashto), wild olive (also mentioned in the Quran as well as in the Old Testament; its Pashto name is Show-one, while in Urdu and Arabic it is called zeethoon), pine nut, wild ash and wild almond. There are also a wide range of shrubs, including spalmai (Pashto) (Calotropis gigantea), buska (Pashto) (Lepidium draba), khamazorai (Pashto) (Withania coagulans), bitter-apple (maraghunai in Pashto, Citrullus colocynthis), pushai (Rheum australe, syn. R. emodi), shinshobae (Mentha sylvestris), makhai (Caragana), harmal (spawnday in Pashto, Peganum harmala), wild fig, barberry, wild cherry, and such herbs as Oman (Pashto; Ephedra intermedia).

In addition to this Pinus gerardiana is common, which is called in Urdu Chilghoza pine (چلغوزا پائن). Its Urdu name is derived from the Persian name (چهل و غوزه), which means 40 nuts in one cone. It grows at elevations from 1,800 to 3,350 m.

Aak in Urdu, Sodom's Apple or swallow-wort in English, karagh in Balochi, spelmai in Pashto (Calotropis procera), grows prolifically in Shinghar. It is deadly poison if eaten, as Alexander the Great discovered when his starving horses and cattle ate them on their long march back from the Indus through the Mekran. Even the juice rubbed onto a horse's hide will kill it, yet a deer can eat the leaves without any ill effects. Then it can go for months without needing other food or water, even as long as two years. Its juice in human eyes causes instant blindness. Suicides have used it, and it is an arbortifacient. It contains the toxic glycosides uscharin, calotropis and calotoxin. Uscharin is an effective pesticide for land snails. Skin from the root is used in decoctions for skin problems. It was a sacred plant in Vedic times, as the leaves were used in sun-worshipping ceremonies.

Lofty mountains in the district are also the abode of the indigenous but endangered species of wild goat called the Sulaiman markhor (Capra falconeri jerdoni) and the wild sheep called the Urial (Ovis orientalis cycloceros). Due to over-hunting many species have migrated to other safe meadows. Wolves, jackals, rabbits, wild cats and deer can be found in Sherani.

Of game birds, chikor and sissy are found at high altitudes, while sand grouse, quail (khirgutae), partridges and Houbara bustards (taloor or charai) are met with in the plains. Other game birds are warblers, hikras, pigeons, golden eagles, sparrows, hawks, falcons, doves and bearded vultures.

Local cuisine
Wheat is the staple food-grain and is made into both leavened (khamira) and unleavened (patira) bread. Kak is also not uncommon in many areas, especially in Harifal areas; it is made by wrapping dough round a hot stone and putting it in burning embers. Both Harifal and Sherani tribesmen, being inhabitants of cold areas, have voracious appetites, like all other Pushtoon. Freshly slaughtered sheep in the summer are usually cooked in boiled salt water without any condiments.

Bread made of maize, locally called dabbali, is found in many areas, especially Khiderzai Harifal. Amongst fruit locally available, shinae (Pistchio Khanjak) is most common, which is eaten both dry and fresh. Shinae are also ground to make a halwa called shinkhary. It is very delicious and eaten with bread. Another fruit is shinanae (Olea cuspidata). Skimmed milk (shnombi) is the favourite beverage in the summer season. Being an isotonic beverage, it is far better than hypertonic Coca-Cola and other cold beverages. Due to its specific chemical composition it also induces sleep.

Dried cheese, koorat, is a kind of pudding made of boiled Indian corn, bruised between two stones, or simply bread, on which rancid grease is poured, then it is mixed with whey and salt added.

Ogra is another common dish prevalent in this hilly area. It is porridge made of crushed wheat, jowar and boiled in skimmed milk. Ogra is not uncommon even today in all areas of the district during summer and spring.

The most popular and delicious meat dish of the district is landae or parsanda. Sheep are especially fattened for the purpose. After slaughtering, their wool is removed, then with the viscera extracted, the carcase is singed on flames, then washed with boiling water. The bones of the back and legs are taken away; the fleshy carcase is then slashed and treated with salt, and preferably seasoned with asafoetida also; to protect it from putrefaction it is rolled up and kept for a night to get rid of the moisture in the meat. It is then hung on poles to expose it to the air and dry it through oxidation. The carcase is protected from damp weather at all costs, otherwise it is infected by fungus and decomposes. When ready, the meat is cut into pieces of about 1 sq ft (0.093 m2) each. These pieces are then hanged on a rope and exposed it to extreme cold (this process is carried out only from mid November to mid December). The meat is ready for use in about a month. It is fit for use until early March. However, as a delicacy it is tasteworthy only from December to mid-February. During these months across the district the cold is sharp-edged, flesh-biting, and even the bright sun during the day is without strength.

"Kaddi Kabab" is another delicious dish. Also rosh, srakaray and sajji are some other popular dishes of the area. Kaddi kabab is usually served on picnics.

Shrines
Famous shrines in the district include that of Mullah Zaman Nika Harifal at Nikan graveyard, the Babakar Nika Harifal shrine in Ghowanza, and those of Mullah Umer Nika Harifal at Killi, and Abdul Haq and Mir Nika at Karmanzai. The shrine of Mullah Rehman Nika Harifal, who happened to be the nephew of the famous saint Babakr Nika, is in Beezi. The trustee of this last shrine is Habibzai Harifal of Beezi.

Zaman Nika stands out, as his scholarship in theology enabled him to gain the title "Mulla" and his spirit was such that he took the honorific Neeka (Grandpa). All local traditions make him the chief patron saint of the whole district. There is a story that he will not permit a roof over his grave, so it is simply a mud-walled enclosure. Both Sherani and Harifal have attached venerable spiritual credentials to their patron saint. His shrine is credited with bringing rain, curing disease and exorcising evil spirits. Saints are invoked to cure diseases and to avert calamities. The potency of the popular myths that have grown up around Zaman Nika has not been diluted by the skepticism of Deobandi maulanas.

Shrines are especially efficacious for issueless women. However, separating myth from history is a difficult enterprise, especially myths of primordial ages, which are often endorsed by rulers and priests and closely linked to religion or spirituality. Shrines generally consist of little more than a heap of stones or a rough mud or stone enclosure.

References

External links

 Sheerani District at www.balochistan.gov.pk

 
2006 establishments in Pakistan
Districts of Balochistan, Pakistan